Hutton is a civil parish in the South Ribble district of Lancashire, England.  It contains five listed buildings that are recorded in the National Heritage List for England.  All of the listed buildings are designated at Grade II, the lowest of the three grades, which is applied to "buildings of national importance and special interest".  The parish is mainly residential, and all the listed buildings are houses.

Buildings

References

Citations

Sources

Lists of listed buildings in Lancashire
Buildings and structures in South Ribble